Arab Wings is an airline based in Amman, Jordan. It operates charter passenger services throughout the Middle East, Persian Gulf and parts of Europe. Its main base is Amman Civil Airport, Amman.

History
Arab Wings was established in 1975 as the first private jet charter operator in the Middle East. Based in Jordan, Arab wings services today include ad hoc charters, air ambulance services, aircraft management, a certified aircraft maintenance center and aircraft for special missions. Arab wings is also certified to do handling services out of all airports in Jordan.  In 2010 Gulf wings, Arab wings sister company was granted its aircraft operating certificate (AOC) in the United Arab Emirates.

Arab Wings and Gulf Wings are owned by the International Wings Group (IWG). IWG also owns the Royal Jordanian Air Academy  and Queen Noor Technical College.

Fleet
Arab Wings operates the following aircraft (as of June 5, 2016):

References

External links
Official website
Arab Wings - Jordan Airport Global Website

1975 establishments in Jordan
Airlines of Jordan
Airlines established in 1975